The 1827 Alabama gubernatorial election was an uncontested election held on August 6, 1827, to elect the governor of Alabama. Jacksonian candidate John Murphy ran unopposed and won 99.25% of the vote. Various write-in candidates made up the other 0.75%.

General election

Candidates
John Murphy, member of the Alabama House of Representatives in 1820 and the Alabama Senate in 1822, Governor of Alabama since 1825.

Results

References

Alabama gubernatorial elections
Alabama
1827 Alabama elections
August 1827 events